Sequoyah (Cherokee: ᏍᏏᏉᏯ, Ssiquoya, or ᏎᏉᏯ, Se-quo-ya;  1770 – August 1843), also known as George Gist or George Guess, was a Native American polymath of the Cherokee Nation. In 1821, he completed his independent creation of the Cherokee syllabary, making reading and writing in Cherokee possible. His achievement was one of the few times in recorded history that an individual who was a member of a pre-literate group created an original, effective writing system. His creation of the syllabary allowed the Cherokee nation to be one of the first North American Indigenous groups to have a written language. Sequoyah was also an important representative for the Cherokee nation, by going to Washington, D.C. to sign two relocations and trading of land treaties.

After seeing its worth, the people of the Cherokee Nation rapidly began to use his syllabary and officially adopted it in 1825. It unified a forcibly divided nation with new ways of communication and a sense of independence. By the 1850s, their literacy rate reached almost 100%, surpassing that of surrounding European-American settlers.

The Cherokee syllabary has had international influence. As diffusion spread, it is believed to have inspired the development of 21 known scripts or writing systems, used in a total of 65 languages in North America, Africa, and Asia.

Early life
Sequoyah's important status has led to several competing accounts of his life that are speculative, contradictory, or fabricated. As noted by John B. Davis, there were few primary documents describing facts of Sequoyah's life. Some anecdotes were passed down orally, but these often conflict or are vague about specific times and places.

Sequoyah was born in the Cherokee town of Tuskegee, Tennessee, around 1778. James Mooney, a prominent anthropologist and historian of the Cherokee people, quoted a cousin as saying that as a little boy, Sequoyah spent his early years with his mother. In the people's matrilineal kinship system, children were considered born into their mother's family and clan, and her male relatives were most important to their upbringing. His name is believed to come from the Cherokee word siqua meaning 'hog'. However, Davis says the name may have been derived from sikwa (either a hog or an opossum) and vi meaning a place or an enclosure. This is a reference either to his childhood deformity or to a later injury that left Sequoyah disabled. According to a descendent of his, he was born with the name 'Gi sqwa ya' which means 'there’s a bird inside.' After repeatedly failing to complete his farm duties, his name was changed to Sequoyah which means 'there’s a pig inside.'  

His mother, Wut-teh, is debated to be either the daughter, sister, or niece of a Cherokee chief. Historians believe her to be related to the chiefs who have been identified as the brothers Old Tassel and Doublehead. John Watts (also known as Young Tassel) was a nephew of the two chiefs, so it is likely that Wut-teh and John Watts were related in some fashion. Due to native customs, Sequoyah learned everything from his mother like the Cherokee language and his first job of a tradesman.

Sources differ as to the true identity of Sequoyah's father. John B. Davis cites Emmet Starr's book, Early History of the Cherokees, as the source for saying that Sequoyah's father was a Virginian fur trader from Swabia named Nathaniel Guyst, Guist, or Gist. Other sources state that his father also could have been an unlicensed German peddler named George Gist, who came into the Cherokee Nation in 1768, where he married and fathered a child. Another source identified his father as Nathaniel Gist, son of Christopher Gist, who became a commissioned officer with the Continental Army associated with George Washington during the American Revolution. Gist would have been a man of some social status and financial backing, Josiah C. Nott claimed he was the "son of a Scotchman". The Cherokee Phoenix reported in 1828 that Sequoyah's father was a half-blood and his grandfather a white man.

The New Georgia Encyclopedia presents another version of Sequoyah's origins, from the history Tell Them They Lie: The Sequoyah Myth (1971), by Traveller Bird, who claims to be a Sequoyah descendant. Bird says that Sequoyah was a full-blood Cherokee who always opposed the submission and assimilation of his people into the white man's culture. The encyclopedia noted that Bird presented no documentary evidence of his assertions, but his account has gained some credibility in academic circles.

In any case, the father was absent before Sequoyah was born. Various explanations have been proposed, but the reason is unknown. Wuh-teh did not remarry afterward (assuming she married her son's father in the first place). Sequoyah had no siblings, and his mother raised him alone. According to Davis, Sequoyah never went to school and never learned English. He and Wuh-teh spoke only Cherokee. As a youth, he spent much of his time tending cattle and working in their garden, while his mother ran a trading post.

Sequoyah became lame early in life, though how, when and where are not known. Some reports indicate this may have been caused by injury in battle; others say the cause was a hunting accident. Davis wrote that an early issue of the Cherokee Advocate said that "...he was the victim of a hydrarthritic trouble of the knee joint, commonly called 'white swelling'." One doctor speculated that he had "anascara [sic]". In any case, lameness prevented him from being a successful farmer or warrior.

Despite his lack of schooling, Sequoyah displayed much natural intelligence. As a child, he had devised and built milk troughs and skimmers for the dairy house that he had constructed. As he grew older and came in contact with more white men, he learned how to make jewelry. He became a noted silversmith, creating various items from the silver coins that trappers and traders carried. He never signed his pieces, so there are none that can be positively identified as his work.

Sequoyah may have taken over his mother's trading post after her death, which Historian John B. Davis claimed occurred about the end of the 18th century. His store became an informal meeting place for Cherokee men to socialize and, especially, drink whiskey. Sequoyah developed a great fondness for alcohol and soon spent much of his time drunk. After a few months he was rarely seen sober, neglecting his farm and trading business, and spending his money buying liquor by the keg.

Fortunately, he realized that he was not making good decisions, and took up new interests. He began to draw, then he took up blacksmithing, so he could repair the iron farm implements that had recently been introduced to the area by traders. Self-taught as usual, he made his own tools, forge and bellows. He was soon doing a good business either repairing items or selling items he had created himself. His spurs and bridle bits were in great demand because he liked to decorate them with silver. Although he maintained his store, he both stopped drinking and stopped selling alcohol.

Up to this point, while Sequoyah was not formally educated, he recognized the advantage that comes with an established written language. He believed one of white people's many advantages was their written language as it allowed them to expand their knowledge, partake in many forms of media, and have a better network of communication. The Cherokee's disadvantage was having to rely solely on memory which sparked his interest in wanting to create some form of a written language for the Cherokee nation.

By 1809, Sequoyah is believed to have started developing what became his Cherokee syllabary, in hopes of unifying the Cherokee nation and making them more independent (see section below). In 2008 archeologist Kenneth B. Tankersley (Cherokee Nation) of the University of Cincinnati announced having found carvings from the syllabary in a cave in southeastern Kentucky, where Sequoyah is known to have had relatives. This cave was the traditional burial site of a Cherokee chief, Red Bird. Some 15 identifiable Cherokee syllabary symbols were found carved into the limestone, accompanied by a date of 1808 or 1818. In addition, there were petroglyphs that appeared to include ancient Cherokee symbols, in addition to bears, deer and birds.

Move to Alabama 
It is unclear when Sequoyah initially moved to Alabama from Tennessee. Many Cherokee began migrating there even before ceding their land around Sequoyah's birthplace in 1819, as they were under continual pressure by European-American settlers. Some sources claim he went with his mother, though there is no confirmed date for her death. Others have stated that it was around 1809, when he started his work on the Cherokee syllabary. Another source claims it was in 1818. However, this date is too late, because Sequoyah was already living in Alabama when he enlisted in the army.

In 1813–14, Sequoyah served as a warrior of the Cherokee Regiment (Col. Gideon Morgan, Commander) at the Battle of Horseshoe Bend against the "Red Sticks" (Creek, or Muskogee, renegades). His white comrades called him either George Guess or George Gist. The Creek War had started during the period of the War of 1812, and represented an effort by traditional Creek to assert their power within the people and expel the European Americans.

During his time serving, he witnessed first hand the disadvantage of not having a written language. Unlike the white soldiers, he and his fellow Cherokee warriors could not write letters to home, read their military orders, or write down any events or thoughts that occurred during their service. This only pushed his determination to create a reading and writing system for the Cherokee language. In his early stages of developing the writing system, he faced criticism from his peers because they believed putting words to paper was witchcraft.

In 1817, Sequoyah signed a treaty which traded Cherokee land in the southeast for land in Arkansas. But in 1819 he backed out of the treaty which resulted in the loss of his first Alabama home, causing him to move to Willstown (modern day Fort Payne), Alabama.

Life after the creation of the syllabary 
Sequoyah's syllabary was completed about 1821 but it was not accepted by the Cherokee nation at first. But after the people began to see its value, the syllabary quickly spread and Sequoyah was awarded a medal from the Cherokee National Council in 1824. This same year, Sequoyah moved from Alabama to Arkansas. Four years after his move, he would reluctantly sign a treaty that exchanged the Cherokee land in Arkansas for Indian Territory (modern day Oklahoma). He was one of the "Old Settler" delegates that went to Washington, D.C. to sign the treaty.

In 1829, Sequoyah settled in present day Sallisaw, Oklahoma, with his wife and daughter. In 1838, the Cherokees from the southeast were relocated to Indian Territory under Chief John Ross. After this relocation, Sequoyah set out to unite the 16 other Old Settlers with the Ross Party because they already established their own government. In 1839, Sequoyah and the 16 other Old Settlers and about 15 representatives of the Ross party signed the Act of Union, and a new Cherokee constitution was created.

Soon after the signing of the new Cherokee constitution, Sequoyah went to Mexico in search for other Cherokees who migrated there. He was hoping to spread his teachings of the syllabary and convince the migrated Cherokees to relocate to Indian Territory.

Syllabary and Cherokee literacy
As a silversmith, Sequoyah dealt regularly with European Americans who had settled in the area. He was impressed by their writing, and referred to their correspondence as "talking leaves". He knew that the papers represented a way to transmit information to other people in distant places, which his fellow American soldiers were able to do but he and other indigenous people could not. A majority of the Cherokee believed that writing was either sorcery, witchcraft, a special gift, or a pretense; Sequoyah accepted none of these explanations. He said that he could invent a way for Cherokees to talk on paper, even though his friends and family thought the idea was absurd.

Creation

Around 1809, Sequoyah began creating a system of writing for the Cherokee language. Over the years, his approach was to use a pictograph or logographic system, where every word in the language had a character or symbol. As he failed to plant his fields, endangering his survival, his friends and neighbors thought he had lost his mind. His wife is said to have burned his initial work, believing it to be witchcraft. He realized that his first approach was impractical because it would require too many pictures to be remembered. He tried making a symbol for every idea, but this also caused too many problems to be practical.

Sequoyah's final attempt was to develop a symbol for each syllable in the language. Using the Bible as a reference along with adaptations from English, Greek, and Hebrew letters, by 1821 he created 86 symbols, later to be 85 symbols, that depict the syllables of the Cherokee language. The syllabary is not an alphabet but a chart or guide to represent each symbol that stands for a consonant-vowel sequence or a syllable. The symbols are written in a chart layout, with the columns being each vowel and the rows being each consonant.

Teaching the syllabary
Sequoyah's six-year old daughter, Ayokeh (also spelled Ayoka), helped him in his process to create the syllabary by being the first person to learn from it. Word spread in their town that they created a new way to communicate, and they were charged and brought to trial by the town chief. Sequoyah and Ayokeh were separated but still communicated by sending letters to one another. Eventually the warriors presiding over their trial, along with the town, believed that Sequoyah did in fact create a new form of communication, and they all wanted him to teach it to them.

He traveled to the Indian Reserves in the Arkansas Territory, where some Cherokee had settled west of the Mississippi River. When he tried to convince the local leaders of the syllabary's usefulness, they doubted him. Sequoyah asked each leader to say a word, which he wrote down, and then called his daughter in to read the words back. This demonstration convinced the leaders to let him teach the syllabary to a few more people. This took several months, during which it was rumored that he might be using the students for sorcery. After completing the lessons, Sequoyah wrote a dictated letter to each student, and read a dictated response. This test convinced the western Cherokee that he had created a practical writing system.

When Sequoyah went to the eastern tribes, he brought a sealed envelope containing a written speech from one of the Arkansas Cherokee leaders. By reading this speech, he convinced the eastern Cherokee to also learn the system. And from there it continued to be taught across the Cherokee tribes and towns in the east.

The syllabary was not hard for the Cherokee people to learn, and by 1830, 90% of Cherokees were literate in their own language.  Over time, naturally, tribes began to form their own dialects depending on what region they lived in. There are two main dialects, the Eastern and Western. The Eastern Dialect, also referred to as middle or Kituwa dialect, is spoken in the Qualla boundary in western North Carolina. This land was purchased by the Cherokees in the 1870s. The Western Dialect, also known as Overhill or Otali dialect, is spoken in eastern Oklahoma and North Carolina. There was a Southern dialect, also called lower dialect, spoken in South Carolina and Georgia until around 1900. But since no more Cherokee tribes reside there, that style of dialect is no more.

Use in official documents and print

In 1825 the Cherokee Nation officially adopted the writing system. The Syllabary provided mass literacy for the Cherokee Nation, which was one of the first indigenous groups to have a functional written language. By the end of 1825, the Bible and hymns were translated into Cherokee. In 1826, the Cherokee National Council commissioned George Lowrey and David Brown to translate and print eight copies of the laws of the Cherokee Nation in the Cherokee language using Sequoyah's new system.

In 1828, the Cherokee Phoenix, religious pamphlets, educational materials, and legal documents were all made using the syllabary. The Cherokee Phoenix was the first bilingual newspaper in North America because it had both English and Cherokee languages. This newspaper helped keep unity in a dispersed Cherokee Nation by allowing them to have their own network of communication and information. The syllabary was used for over 100 years to make newspapers, books, religious texts, and almanacs (calendars).

When the Cherokee Nation purchased their first printing press, some of Sequoyah’s handwritten symbols needed to be modified. To make the symbols more clear, they were replaced by adaptations from the Roman alphabet, and used in the Syllabary from that point on.

Life in Indian Territory
After the Nation accepted his syllabary in 1825, Sequoyah traveled to the Cherokee lands in the Arkansas Territory. There he set up a blacksmith shop and a salt works. He continued to teach the syllabary to anyone who wished.

In 1828, Sequoyah journeyed to Washington, D.C., as part of a delegation to negotiate a treaty for land in the planned Indian Territory. While in Washington, D.C., he sat for a formal portrait painted by Charles Bird King (see image at the top of this article). He holds a copy of the syllabary in his left hand and is smoking a long-stemmed pipe. During his trip, he met representatives of other Native American tribes. Inspired by these meetings, he decided to create a syllabary for universal use among Native American tribes. Sequoyah began to journey into areas of present-day Arizona and New Mexico, to meet with tribes there.

In 1829, Sequoyah moved to a location on Big Skin Bayou, where he built Sequoyah's Cabin that became his home for the rest of his life. It was declared a National Historic Landmark in 1965. (The present-day city of Sallisaw, Oklahoma, developed near here.) The house was operated by the Oklahoma Historical Society until it was purchased by the Cherokee Nation on 9 November 2016.

In 1839, when the Cherokee were bitterly divided over the issue of removal to Indian Territory, Sequoyah joined with Jesse Bushyhead to try to reunite the Cherokee Nation. Sequoyah, representing the Western Cherokee, and Bushyhead representing the Eastern Cherokee, made a joint plea at a tribal council meeting at Takatoka on 20 June 1839. They succeeded in getting a voice vote to hold a new council of all Cherokee to resolve the reunification issues. This is when the Act of Union and a new Cherokee Constitution was created.

Final journey and death

Sequoyah dreamed of seeing reunification of the splintered Cherokee Nation. In the spring of 1842, he began a trip to locate other Cherokee bands who were believed to have fled to Mexico and attempted to persuade them to return to the Cherokee Nation, by then mostly residing in Indian Territory. He was accompanied by his son, Teesy (Chusaleta), as well as other Cherokee men identified as Co-tes-ka, Nu-wo-ta-na, Cah-ta-ta, Co-wo-si-ti, John Elijah, and The Worm:

Sometime between 1843 and 1845, he died due to an estimated respiratory infection during a trip to San Fernando de Rosas in Coahuila, Mexico. A letter written in 1845 by accompanying Cherokee stated that he had died in 1843:

Warren's Trading House, Red River,
April 21st, 1845.
We, the undersigned Cherokees, direct from the Spanish Dominions, do hereby certify that George Guess of the Cherokee Nation, Arkansas, departed this life in the town of San-fernando in the month of August, 1843, and his son Chusaleta is at this time on the Brasos River, Texas, about thirty miles above the falls, and he intends returning home this fall. Given under our hands the day and date written.

STANDING X ROCK (his mark)
STANDING X BOWLES (his mark)
WATCH X JUSTICE (his mark)

WITNESSES
Daniel G. Watson
Jesse Chisholm

The village of San Fernando de Rosas was later renamed as Zaragoza.

In 1938, the Cherokee Nation Principal Chief J. B. Milam funded an expedition to find Sequoyah's grave in Mexico. A party of Cherokee and non-Cherokee scholars embarked from Eagle Pass, Texas, on January 1939. They found a grave site near a fresh water spring in Coahuila, Mexico, but could not conclusively determine the grave site was that of Sequoyah.

In 2011, the Muskogee Phoenix published an article relating a discovery in 1903 of a gravesite in the Wichita Mountains by Hayes and Fancher, which they believed was Sequoyah's. The two men said the site was in a cave and contained a human skeleton with one leg shorter than the other, a long-stemmed pipe, two silver medals, a flintlock rifle and an ax. However, the site was far north of the Mexican border.

International influence
Sequoyah's work has had international influence, encouraging the development of syllabaries for other, previously unwritten languages. The news that an illiterate Cherokee had created a syllabary spread throughout the United States and its territories. A missionary working in northern Alaska read about it and created a syllabary, what has become known as Cree syllabics. This syllabic writing inspired other indigenous groups across Canada to adapt the syllabics to create writing for their languages.

A literate Cherokee emigrated to Liberia, where he discussed his people's syllabary. A Bassa language speaker of Liberia was inspired to create his own syllabary, and other indigenous groups in West Africa followed suit, creating their own syllabaries.

A missionary in China read about the Cree syllabary and was inspired to follow that example in writing a local language in China. The result of the diffusion of Sequoyah's work has been the development of a total of 21 known scripts, which have been used to write more than 65 languages.

Legacy

Due to Sequoyah's contributions and achievements in Cherokee history, there are statues, monuments, museums, and paintings dedicated in his honor across the United States and in various genres.

Science:
 The genus of the coast redwood (Sequoia sempervirens) is named after Sequoyah.

Museums:

 The Carnegie Museum of Art, Architecture Hall, Pittsburgh, Pennsylvania Sequoyah Alphabet
 The Sequoyah Birthplace Museum in Monroe County, eastern Tennessee, features his life and Cherokee culture.
 In 1964, Sequoyah was inducted into the Hall of Great Westerners of the National Cowboy & Western Heritage Museum

Paintings and pictures:

 Artist Henry Inman painted a portrait of Sequoyah ca. 1830; it now hangs in the United States National Portrait Gallery
 Sequoyah is pictured on the reverse of the 2017 Sacagawea Dollar coin

Statues and memorials:

 Oklahoma gave a statue of Sequoyah to the National Statuary Hall Collection in 1917. This was the first statue representing a Native American to be placed in the hall. It was created by Vinnie Ream, and is displayed in the Capitol rotunda in Washington, D.C.
 A monument honoring Chief Sequoyah of the Cherokee Nation was dedicated in September 1932 at Calhoun, Georgia. 34.530286°N 84.936806°W
 1939, a bronze panel with a raised figure of Sequoyah, by Lee Lawrie, was erected in his honor at the Library of Congress
 A Sequoyah memorial was installed in front of the Cherokee Museum in North Carolina

Landmark:

 Sequoyah's Cabin, where he lived during 1829–1844 in the Cherokee Nation, Indian Territory, was designated a National Historic Landmark in 1965 in Oklahoma.Other:
 On 20 December 1980 the United States Postal Service issued a 19¢ stamp in his honor in the Great Americans series.

Other:

 Addressing the exalted place Sequoyah holds in Cherokee imagination, the Cherokee composer and musicologist Jack Kilpatrick (composer) wrote: "Sequoyah was always in the wilderness. He walked about, but he was not a hunter. I wonder what he was looking for."
 Johnny Cash sang about Sequoyah in his 1964 song "The Talking Leaves"
 Sequoyah School in Pasadena was named in honor of Sequoyah.

In 1824, the General Council of the Eastern Cherokee awarded Sequoyah a large silver medal in honor of the syllabary. According to Davis, one side of the medal bore his image surrounded by the inscription in English, "Presented to George Gist by the General Council of the Cherokee for his ingenuity in the invention of the Cherokee Alphabet." The reverse side showed two long-stemmed pipes and the same inscription written in Cherokee. Sequoyah was said to wear the medal throughout the rest of his life and it was buried with him.

Contemporary use of Cherokee 
Cherokee is mainly spoken in Oklahoma, North Carolina, and Arkansas; between 1500 and 2100 people actively speak Cherokee in these three main areas. In a 2018 survey, it states that there are 1,200 Cherokee speakers who live in the Cherokee nation of Oklahoma, 217 speakers in the Eastern North Carolina, and 101 speakers in the United Keetoowah tribe of Cherokee in Arkansas. And that the majority of the Cherokee speakers are people over 40.

Today, in the Cherokee nation (northeast Oklahoma) the syllabary is present on street signs and buildings, is the co-official language with English, and is taught in schools in Oklahoma and North Carolina. The Cherokee nation in the 21st century is trying to integrate this language into people's daily lives. Their goal in 2008 is to increase immersion programs in schools, encourage older Cherokee members to teach the younger generations, and in 50 years to have about 80% more of fluent Cherokee speakers. People of all ages are taught the language, parents and adults, children in schools, and it is offered at several universities in Oklahoma and North Carolina.

During the time when white settler Indian Removal policies removed indigenous tribes from their lands, a process now known as the Trail of Tears, the use of the Cherokee language dropped dramatically. Use of any indigenous language in the government run Indian boarding schools resulted in some kind of physical punishment. In the late 20th century, there was a revitalization of the Cherokee language with programs, run by three sovereign Cherokee tribes, and online courses.

Namesake honors
 A small Mississippian arrowhead found throughout the Midwest and upper south was named Sequoyah by James Brown in 1968.
 The Sequoia trees in California were named Sequoia gigantea in 1847 by Austrian biologist Stephan Endlicher. While it was assumed that this was in honor of Sequoyah, this hypothesis has been questioned. Twenty-first century research in Austria has established that Endlicher, also a published linguist, was familiar with Sequoyah's work. See Chief Sequoyah, a Sequoia tree in Sequoia National Park.
 A crystalline chemical compound found by distilling the needles of the trees was described by Georg Lunge and Th. Steinkaukler in 1880 and named sequoiene.
 The caterpillar of the sequoia-borer moth, a sesiid moth, was named Bembecia sequoiae.
 The name of the district where Sequoyah lived in present-day Oklahoma was changed to the Sequoyah District in 1851. When Oklahoma was admitted to the union, that area was recorded as Sequoyah County.
 The proposed State of Sequoyah was named in his honor.
 Sequoyah Research Center is dedicated to collecting and archiving Native American writing and literature.
 Mount Sequoyah in the Great Smoky Mountains.
 Mount Sequoyah in Fayetteville, Arkansas was named in honor of him after the city donated the top of East Mountain to the Methodist Assembly for a retreat.
 The Sequoyah Hills neighborhood of Knoxville, Tennessee.
 The Tennessee Valley Authority Sequoyah Nuclear Plant was named for him. 
 The Sequoyah Marina on Norris Lake in Tennessee, upstream from Norris Dam on the Clinch River.
 The USS Sequoia was a yacht officially used for decades by American presidents (it is now privately owned).
 Sequoyah Caverns and Ellis Homestead is in Valley Head, Alabama.
 Sequoyah Country Club, Oakland, California
 Sequoyah Council – A Boy Scouts of America Council located in Northeast Tennessee.
 The Sequoyah Book Award is chosen annually by students in Oklahoma.
 Many schools have been named for him, including
 Sequoyah High School, (now a middle school) Doraville, Georgia (Designed by architect John Portman)

College of the Sequoias, Visalia, California
Sequoyah High School (Georgia), Canton (Cherokee County), Georgia 
Sequoyah High School (Oklahoma), a Native American boarding school in Tahlequah, Oklahoma
Sequoyah High School (Tennessee), Madisonville, Tennessee
Sequoia High School (Redwood City, California)
Sequoya Elementary School, Tahlequah, Oklahoma
Sequoyah Elementary School, Shawnee, Oklahoma
Sequoia Junior High School, Simi Valley, California
Sequoyah Elementary School, Tulsa, Oklahoma
Sequoia Elementary School, San Diego, California
Sequoya Elementary School, Russellville, Arkansas
Sequoya Middle School, Broken Arrow, Oklahoma
Sequoya Elementary School, Derwood, Maryland
Sequoyah School, Pasadena, California

See also
 History of writing
 Bob Benge, Cherokee leader
 Old Tassel
 List of people who disappeared
 Hastings Shade (1941–2010), fifth-generation direct descendant of Sequoyah
 Tahlonteeskee (Cherokee chief)

Notes

References

Bibliography
Bender, Margaret. (2002) Signs of Cherokee Culture: Sequoyah's Syllabary in Eastern Cherokee Life. Chapel Hill: University of North Carolina Press.
Feeling, Durbin. Cherokee-English Dictionary: Tsalagi-Yonega Didehlogwasdohdi. Tahlequah, Oklahoma: Cherokee Nation, 1975: xvii
Holmes, Ruth Bradley; Betty Sharp Smith (1976). Beginning Cherokee: Talisgo Galiquogi Dideliquasdodi Tsalagi Digoweli. Norman: University of Oklahoma Press. .
Foreman, Grant, Sequoyah, University of Oklahoma Press, Norman, OK, 1938.
Langguth, A. J. Driven West: Andrew Jackson and the Trail of Tears to the Civil War. New York, Simon & Schuster. 2010. .
McKinney, Thomas and Hall, James, History of the Indian Tribes of North America. (Philadelphia, PA, 1837–1844).
McLoughlin, William G., After the Trail of Tears: The Cherokees' Struggle for Sovereignty 1839–1880. University of North Carolina Press. Chapel Hill. 1993. .

External links

 "Invention of the Cherokee Alphabet", Cherokee Phoenix, 13 August 1828
 "Sequoyah", Tiro Typeworks
 "Sequoyah (aka George Gist)", a North Georgia Notable
 The Cherokee Nation Official Website
 "The Official Cherokee Font" at the Cherokee Nation Official Website

 

1770s births
1843 deaths
1840s missing person cases
18th-century Native Americans
19th-century American inventors
American blacksmiths
American people with disabilities
American silversmiths
Creators of writing systems
Cherokee Nation people (1794–1907)
Cherokee Nation politicians (1794–1907)
Missing person cases in Mexico
Native Americans in the War of 1812
People from Knox County, Tennessee
People from Tennessee in the War of 1812
People of the Creek War
People of Indian Territory